Pete Prown (born 1963) is an American writer and magazine editor, painter, guitarist, and music journalist. He has worked as the editor-in-chief of Guitar Shop magazine and contributing editor for Vintage Guitar. His writing has also appeared in publications such as Guitar Player, Guitar for the Practicing Musician, InTune Monthly, Philadelphia and PopMatters.

Works 
Fiction Books. Among other projects, Prown writes fantasy fiction, publishing the following via Amazon.com: 
 Thimble Down (2013)
 Devils & Demons (2014)
 The Lost Ones
Master Black (2017) -- print and audiobook editions

Paintings.
Samples of Pete Prown's acclaimed artwork can be found on his website. 

Recordings. Beginning in 2006, released a series of indie CDs showcasing his noted guitar work and receiving strong reviews:

Guitar Garden - China Rose (2006)
Guitar Garden - Secret Space (2007)
Sir Clive & the Raging Cartographers - Guitar Safari (2009)
Guitar Garden - Guitar Garden III (2011)
Oval Planet - Trench Poems (2019)
Gordon/Prown/King - Moorish Code (2020)
Miscellaneous recordings (2019-2022)

Music Journalism. From 1993 to 1998 Prown was the editor in chief of the international magazine Guitar Shop, followed by his role as a Contributing Editor to Vintage Guitar magazine. He is also the author of several rock-music reference and guitar-instructional books and CDs, such as:

Modal Riffs for Rock Guitar (1995)
Legends of Rock Guitar (co-written with HP Newquist, 1997)
Gear Secrets of the Guitar Legends (co-written with Lisa Sharken, 2003)
Shred! The Ultimate Guide to Warp-Speed Guitar (co-written with Rich Maloof, 2006)

Prown has written for Guitar Player, Guitar One, Guitar for the Practicing Musician, Car Stereo Review, Musician's Planet, InTune Monthly, Music Alive, Philadelphia Magazine, as well as many others.

Other Publishing From 1998 to 2013, Pete Prown was also editor of the gardening magazine Green Scene for the Pennsylvania Horticultural Society, based in Philadelphia. He's also edited several books (such as Jane Godshalk's Flower Arranging Secrets), and is an accomplished photographer and communicator.

References

1963 births
Living people
American rock guitarists
American male guitarists
American music journalists
American fantasy writers
20th-century American guitarists
20th-century American male musicians